Boris Ravilyevich Akbulatov (born December 5, 1949, Ladva village, Karelo-Finnish SSR) is a Russian artist and illustrator.

Since 1985 he was engaged in creating illustrations to epic Kalevala

He was awarded several times for his book illustrations. In 2003 he was awarded an honorary title of Laureate of the Republic of Karelia.

References

1949 births
Living people
People from Prionezhsky District
Russian artists
Russian Karelian people